Micryletta is a genus of microhylid frogs. Prior to 2018, only 3 species were recognized, but phylogenetic studies since then have found a much higher species diversity within the genus.

Species

References 

 

 
Amphibian genera